The Croatian Chess Championship is the annual individual national chess championship of Croatia.

Winners 

| valign="top" |
{| class="sortable wikitable"
! Year !! Venue !!  Women's Champion
|-
| 1992 || Pula || Albina Paraminski
|-
| 1992 || Đakovo || Vlasta Maček
|-
| 1993 || Zagreb || Mirjana Medić
|-
| 1994 || Poreč ||Mirjana Medić
|-
| 1995 || Slavonski Brod ||Mirjana Medić
|-
| 1996 ||Pula||Mirjana Medić
|-
| 1998 ||Pula||Zorica Puljek Salai
|-
| 1999 ||Pula||Vlasta Maček
|- 
| 2002 ||Zagreb||Mara Jelica
|-
| 2003 || Rabac ||Mirjana Medić
|-
| 2004 ||Zagreb||Rajna Šargač
|-
| 2006 ||Zagreb||Mirjana Medić
|-
| 2007 ||Đakovo||Borka Frančišković
|-
| 2008 || Sveti Martin na Muri ||Borka Frančišković
|-
| 2009 || Krapina ||Borka Frančišković
|-
| 2010 || Topusko ||Borka Frančišković
|-
| 2011 ||Topusko||Borka Frančišković
|-
| 2012 || Rijeka || Mirjana Medić
|-
| 2013 ||Zagreb||Borka Frančišković
|-
| 2014 ||Đakovo||Valentina Golubenko
|-
| 2015 ||Đakovo||Borka Frančišković
|-
| 2016 ||Zagreb||Kristina Šarić
|-
| 2017 || Malinska || Ana Berke
|-
| 2018 ||Zagreb||Ana Berke
|-
|2020
|Durdevac
|Patricija Vujnović
|}
|}

References

 The Week in Chess by Mark Crowther: 1995, 1998, 2000, 2000 playoff, 2001, 2002, 2004, 2005, 2006, 2007
FIDE: 2008, 2008 playoff, 2009, 2009 playoff, 2011, 2012 women, 2013 women
Croatian Chess Federation: list of winners 1992-2011 (men), list of women's champions 1992-2006, 2012 men
Some biographies of Croatian players

Chess national championships
Women's chess national championships
Championship